Marcel Roy (born 21 April 1942) is a Canadian former cyclist. He competed in the individual road race and the team time trial events at the 1968 Summer Olympics.

References

External links
 

1942 births
Living people
Canadian male cyclists
Olympic cyclists of Canada
Cyclists at the 1968 Summer Olympics
Cyclists from Quebec City
Pan American Games medalists in cycling
Pan American Games gold medalists for Canada
Cyclists at the 1967 Pan American Games
Medalists at the 1967 Pan American Games